"The Satanist's Apprentice" is the fifth episode of the sixth season of the American science fiction television series Legends of Tomorrow, revolving around the eponymous team of superheroes and their time travelling adventures. It is set in the Arrowverse, sharing continuity with the other television series of the universe. The episode was written by Keto Shimizu and Ray Utarnachitt, and directed by Caity Lotz. It is a part-animated episode, inspired by the Disney animated films of the 1990s.

Lotz stars as Sara Lance / White Canary, and is joined by principal cast members Tala Ashe, Jes Macallan, Olivia Swann, Shayan Sobhian, Lisseth Chavez, Nick Zano and Matt Ryan. The episode follows two storylines; in one, Astra Logue apprentices under Aleister Crowley, leading to catastrophic consequences for the other Legends. In the second, Sara meets Bishop, her kidnapper, and seeks to escape.

"The Satanist's Apprentice" was first aired in the United States on The CW on June 6, 2021, and was watched by 0.42 million viewers with a 0.1 share among adults aged 18 to 49. The episode received generally positive reviews from critics, who appreciated the animated portions.

Plot 

At John Constantine's manor, Astra Logue struggles with everyday chores and her neighbor, Robert Truss, and is ignored by Constantine. Astra finds Aleister Crowley, an occultist trapped in a painting who offers to teach her magic intending to find the Fountain of Imperium, a source of alien magic. During an argument with Constantine, Astra gives Crowley control of his body. When the Legends arrive at the manor, Astra transforms them into household objects, and when Astra tries to stop Crowley from usurping Truss's and the Legends' souls, he betrays her and transforms everyone into cartoon characters. Astra uses a spell created by her mother Natalie to remove all magic, which re-traps Crowley and restores everyone to their bodies, but also depowers everyone of their magic, including Constantine, prompting him and Astra to begin anew.

Meanwhile, Sara Lance meets Bishop, her kidnapper and creator of all Ava clones. After healing Sara, Bishop claims that human greed doomed Earth and intends to restart humanity using alien DNA, wanting Sara to teach them strength. Sara is betrayed by a deceitful Ava clone, inadvertently leading Bishop to her ship, who reveals that the pods collected its inhabitants' DNA. Sara kills Bishop, but she is knocked out only to meet him again back at his lair.

Production

Development 
In April 2021, Legends of Tomorrow showrunner Phil Klemmer explained that the concept of a part-animated episode in season 6 began as a joke: "The reason we did that originally is that we broke it as live-action, and then there's a point in the story where it becomes so outlandish that I was really having a difficult time seeing it in my head as live-action. I was like, 'Guys, this feels like a '90s Disney movie.' It was sort of a joke". The episode is cast member Caity Lotz's second episode as director after the fifth season episode "Mortal Khanbat", and was written by Keto Shimizu and Ray Utarnachitt.

Writing 
The title of the episode, "The Satanist's Apprentice", is a pun on The Sorcerer's Apprentice, a poem by Johann Wolfgang von Goethe. Klemmer said the focus of the episode would be Astra Logue, portrayed by Olivia Swann, and that she would serve as the episode's version of a Disney Princess. The episode follows two parallel storylines, Astra's storyline at John Constantine's manor, and  Sara Lance / White Canary's storyline in Bishop's lair, which Lotz felt "didn't go together" tonally, since they "were kind of their own thing, and both of those storylines were pretty full and dynamic and had their very own loud personality". She considered it a challenge to ensure they fitted together so that "it still felt like you were watching the same show, which is hard when you have space aliens and then Disney princess animation and normal life". The episode references the TV series Wynonna Earp, which Lotz said was a nod to an episode from that series in which a character mentions Sara.

Casting 
Main cast members Caity Lotz, Tala Ashe, Jes Macallan, Olivia Swann, Shayan Sobhian, Lisseth Chavez, Nick Zano and Matt Ryan appear as Sara Lance / White Canary, Zari Tarazi, Ava Sharpe, Astra Logue, Behrad Tarazi, Spooner Cruz, Nate Heywood / Steel and John Constantine. The guest cast includes Raffi Barsoumian as Bishop, Matt Lucas as the voice of Aleister Crowley, and Russell Roberts as Robert Truss.

Filming and visual effects 
Filming for the episode began on December 8, 2020, and ended by December 18. The opening scene where a car splashes water on Astra was not scripted; it was originally intended for simply rain to feature in the scene, but Lotz wanted a "waterfall" to hit Astra and Swann said, "One-hundred percent! More water! Make it a bigger splash!". Lotz also sought to make the opening montage depicting Astra's everyday life "kind of like a rom-com". Since Lotz had no experience with animation, she collaborated with Tony Cervone, who has worked as the animation director on various projects for Warner Bros. Animation. Lotz said the episode was easier to direct than her directorial debut because that episode relied heavily on practical effects and stunts, whereas this was a "little bit more of a mind challenge". Swann wanted Astra's freckles be retained when she enters her animated avatar, and for her animated skin tone to match her real skin tone. Since the original script mentions that the animated Astra speaks with a "Snow White cadence", Swann watched Snow White and the Seven Dwarfs (1937) to achieve this, but finally settled on a speaking style that helped everyone "make sure it was still Astra" who Swann said was nothing like a Disney princess.

Release

Broadcast 
"The Satanist's Apprentice" was first aired in the United States on The CW on June 6, 2021. It was watched by 0.42 million viewers with a 0.1 share among adults aged 18 to 49.

Critical reception 
Writing for Screen Rant, Bruno Savill De Jong wrote, "This is the outlandish, anything-goes storytelling that Legends of Tomorrow revels in". He praised the animation for its "softness" and "fluidity", adding that the episode "advances the main plot but mostly allows a character-focused episode on Astra". Though he criticized the episode for certain predictable plot details, "they still land, and the accompanying ambitious flourishes of the episode make "The Satanist's Apprentice" a highpoint of an already solid season." Allison Shoemaker of The A.V. Club rated the episode A−, saying "the show's always-game cast manage to make the wildly disparate elements blend and fuse in a way that's both disorienting and incredibly satisfying". Michael Patterson of Bam Smack Pow gave the episode a B rating, saying, "Legends of Tomorrow part-animated adventure may suffer from a somewhat predictable plot but the execution will still bring a smile to your face".

References

External links 
 
 "The Satanist's Apprentice" at Rotten Tomatoes

2021 American television episodes
Legends of Tomorrow episodes
Television episodes with live action and animation
Television episodes directed by Caity Lotz